Peter Andrew Sherwood (born 30 September 1948, Budapest) is a British Professor of Linguistics, who was born in Hungary, and left the country with his family after 1956. He is a writer, editor, translator and lexicographer and as the Laszlo Birinyi Sr., Distinguished Professor in Hungarian Language and Culture at the University of North Carolina at Chapel Hill.

Personal life
Peter Sherwood is married, his wife is Julia Sherwood, née Kalinová, they have one daughter.

Career

Education
Manchester Grammar School, England, (1960–1966)
University of London, 1970., (BA),
University of London, 1976., (Diploma in Linguistics)

Professional experience
2008-2014 Laszlo Birinyi Sr. Distinguished professor of Hungarian language and culture university of North Carolina at Chapel Hill.
1972–2007 Lecturer (later: senior lecturer) In Hungarian, school of Slavonic and east European studies, University of London,
	    (later: University College London)

Visiting lectureship
United Kingdom, University of Cambridge: visiting lecturer, 1999,
Outside United Kingdom:
University of Szeged, Hungary: visiting lecturer, November–December 2006,
University of Rome: visiting lecturer, November 1995,
University of Debrecen, Hungary: visiting lecturer, March 1995,
University of Budapest: visiting lecturer, January 1994,

Honours
 2011: Lotz János Medal from the International Association for Hungarian Studies
 2007: Officer's Cross of the Order of Merit of the Republic of Hungary
 2003: G. F. Cushing Prize of the British-Hungarian Fellowship (London) for "outstanding contribution[s] to Hungarian linguistics, literary translation and for fostering appreciation of Hungarian culture in Great Britain"
 2001: Pro Cultura Hungarica Hungarian State Prize for contributions to Anglo-Hungarian relations
 1999: Prize of the Hungarian Milán Füst Foundation
 2020: Budavári Tóth Árpád Műfordítói Díj,

Membership of professional organizations
2008–, Linguistic Society of America,
2008–, American Hungarian Educators' Association,
1996–2007, British Hungarian Fellowship (London) Executive Committee member,
1975 onwards, International Association of Hungarian Studies, Budapest,
1971 onwards, Philological Society, London,
1970 onwards, Suomalais-Ugrilainen Seura, Helsinki,

Bibliography

Books
A Concise Introduction to Hungarian London: School of Slavonic and East European Studies, University of London. 1996. 139 pp.  SSEES Occasional Papers, 34. 
Review: M. Kontra in: Modern Nyelvoktatás (Budapest)  VII. évf. 2–3 sz. 2001. September; 102–104.
The BUDALEX Guide to Hungarian [Distributed at the Third International Congress of the European Association for Lexicography, EURALEX, Budapest 4–9 September 1988]. Budapest: Akadémiai Kiadó. 1988. 12 pp.

Dictionary editing
Oxford angol-magyar szótár nyelvtanulóknak English-Hungarian Wordpower Dictionary. Janet Phillips (publisher's editor), Peter Sherwood (senior editor). Oxford: Oxford University Press. 2002. 768 pp. 
New (revised) impression. 2003
Third impression 2004
Fourth (revised) impression 2006
Awarded Outstanding Hungarian Dictionary prize by the Hungarian Academy of Sciences on the 4th Day of the Dictionary in Hungary, Budapest, 17 October 2007
A Concise Hungarian-English Dictionary. Tamás Magay, László Országh (1907–1984), "Contributing Editor" (de facto co-editor) Peter Sherwood.  Budapest: Akadémiai Kiadó and Oxford: Oxford University Press. 1990. 1144 pp
Reviews:
Eyvor Fogarty Professional Translator and Interpreter (London) No. 3 1990, 43–44
R. J. W. Evans Slavonic and East European Review (London) Vol. 69 No. 4 (October 1991), 688
Jeffrey Harlig Slavic and East European Journal (USA) Vol. 36 No. 3 (Fall 1992), 376–378
Miklós Kontra Budapesti Könyvszemle (Budapest) Vol. 5 No. 3 (Autumn 1993), 377–380

Book edited (Editors listed in alphabetical order)
László Péter, Martyn Rady, Peter Sherwood (eds) Lajos Kossuth sent word ... Papers delivered on the occasion of the bicentenary of Kossuth's birth.  SSEES Occasional Papers, 56. London: Hungarian Cultural Centre and School of Slavonic and East European Studies, University College London. 2003. 263 pp.

Teaching and edited
Phrasal Verbs: Tanuljuk meg a 100 legfontosabbat! The 100 most important phrasal verbs of English for Hungarian students. Janet Phillips (publisher's editor), Peter Sherwood (senior editor).  Oxford.: Oxford University Press. 2003. 122 pp.

Chapters
'Living through something: notes on the work of Imre Kertész' in: Ritchie Robertson, Joseph Sherman (eds) The Yiddish Presence in European Literature: Inspiration and Interaction. Proceedings of the Fourth and Fifth International Mendel Friedman Conference. Legenda Studies in Yiddish, 5. European Humanities Research Centre. Oxford: Oxbow Books. 2005. 108–116. 
'The label pre-socialist in Hungarian lexicography of the 1950s' in: R. B. Pynsent (ed) The Phoney Peace.  Power and Culture in Central Europe 1945–1949.  London: School of Slavonic and East European Studies/University College London. SSEES Occasional Papers, 46. 2000. 406–442. 
"A nation may be said to live in its language": some socio-historical perspectives on attitudes to Hungarian' in: Robert B. Pynsent (ed) The Literature of Nationalism. Essays on East European Identity, London: SSEES/Macmillan. 1996. 27–39. ISBN (UK ED) 0-333-66682-8
'Hungarian' in: A. J. Walford and J. E. O. Screen (eds) A guide to foreign language courses and dictionaries, third edition revised and enlarged. London: The Library Association. 1977. 260–263.

Peer-reviewed articles and papers
Egy Márai-regény fordításának nyelvészeti problémái. The German and English translations of Sándor Márai's novel, A gyertyák csonkig égnek: Die Glut and Embers, Hungarológiai Évkönyv 2008.  IX. évfolyam. Pécs: PTE  BTK. 2008. 124–134. ISSN 1585-9673

Published translations

Books
: St. Margaret of Scotland and Hungary. Glasgow: John Burns & Sons. 1973, 63 pp.
’s four film-scripts Love spells and death rites in Hungary. London: Institute of Contemporary Arts/Budapest: Gondolat Kiadó. 1986. 205 pp. ,  (stitched)
Béla Hamvas: Trees. Szentendre : Editio M, 2006, 64 pp. 
Miklós Vámos: The Book of Fathers.
Imre Kertész: Europe’s oppresive legacy. In: Comparative Central European Holocaust studies, 2009. 
Noémi Szécsi: The Finno-Ugrian Vampire, London : Stork Press Ltd., 2012. 14 October,
Béla Hamvas: The Philosophy of Wine. Budapest : Medio, 2016, 115 pp., 
Antal Szerb: Reflections in the Library: selected literary essays 1926–1944. Cambridge: Legenda 2016. 132 pp. 
Ádám Bodor: The Birds of Verhovina. Jantar Publishing, 2022, 280 pp., 
Krisztina Tóth: Barcode. To be published on 1 December 2022, Jantar Publishing, 234 pp.,

Conferences
70 Years of Hungarian Studies at the University of London, UCL–SSEES, London, 2007
35 Years of Hungarian Studies at Szeged University, Szeged, 2006

References

Sources
University of North Carolina at Chapel Hill – Peter Sherwood webpage 
 Language Unit – Teaching Staff: Peter Sherwood – Publications

External links

 Slavic Languages and Literatures
Reading the 1956 Revolution:  The Themes of Ferenc Juhász's Poem Évszakok (1957) in the Shadow of its English "Translations". 
The Book of Fathers

1948 births
Living people
Hungarian translators
Hungarian essayists
Male essayists
20th-century Hungarian male writers
Writers from Budapest
People educated at Manchester Grammar School
Alumni of the University of London
Officer's Crosses of the Order of Merit of the Republic of Hungary (civil)
Hungarian–English translators